The 1945–46 Houston Cougars men's basketball team represented the University of Houston in the college basketball 1945–46 season. It was their inaugural year of season play.  The head coach for the Cougars was Alden Pasche, who was serving in his 1st year in that position.  The team played its home games at Jeppesen Gymnasium on-campus in Houston and were members of the Lone Star Conference.  Houston captured its first conference regular season title, and competed in the postseason in the 1946 NAIA basketball tournament where they were defeated by eventual national runner-up Indiana State in the second round.

Roster
Charlie Manichia also served as Houston's first starting quarterback.  Guy Lewis served as an assistant for Houston from 1953 to 1956, and as head coach from 1956 to 1986.

Schedule

|-
!colspan=12 style=|Regular Season

|-
!colspan=12 style=|NAIA Tournament

References

Houston Cougars men's basketball seasons
Houston
Houston
Houston